Friedrichs may refer to:

Names 

 Bob Friedrichs, American baseball pitcher
 Carl Joseph Friedrichs, German printer, author and gold prospector
 Friedrich Friedrichs, German World War I fighter ace
 Fritz Walter Paul Friedrichs, German chemist
 Hanns-Joachim Friedrichs, German journalist
 Helmuth Friedrichs, German Nazi Party official
 George Friedrichs, American sailor and Olympian
 Georgie Friedrichs, Australian rugby sevens player
 Kurt Otto Friedrichs, German American mathematician
 Paul Friedrichs, East German motocross racer
 Rebecca Friedrichs, lead plaintiff in the Friedrichs v. California Teachers Ass'n case

Other uses 

 Friedrichs v. California Teachers Ass'n, a case before the Supreme Court of the United States

See also 

 Fredericks
 Friedrich